Delfo Zorzi (born July 3, 1947), presently known as , is an Italian-born Japanese neo-fascist.

Biography
Delfo Zorzi was born in Arzignano, near Vicenza, Italy, on July 3, 1947. In 1968 he moved to Naples to study Asian languages, later graduating with a PhD. In 1974 he moved to Japan and in 1989 he took Japanese citizenship with his present name, Roi Hagen.

The fifth person arrested for the crime, he was tried in absentia for the 1969 Piazza Fontana bombing, but was later acquitted on appeal for lack of evidence on March 12, 2004. On May 3, 2005 the Court of Cassation acquitted Zorzi from the accusation. In 2014, the supreme Court of Cassation also acquitted Zorzi from the accusation.

In September 2005 an article by the magazine L'Espresso accused Zorzi of dealing furs in Italy via a series of firms under an assumed alias. 

Zorzi is the financial director behind several fashion stores (i.e luxury bags, furs, leather) in Europe, including some in Sweden. In October 2021, his name was mentioned in the Pandora Papers. Accused of tax evasion to the tune of 75 million euros to the tax authorities, he had bought a luxury home using the services of a shell company.

References

1947 births
Living people
Italian neo-fascists
Italian expatriates in Japan
Italian emigrants to Japan
People acquitted of crimes
Japanese fascists
Naturalized citizens of Japan
Overturned convictions in Italy
People from Arzignano